Bobby G. Peters (born February 21, 1949) is a Superior Court judge in Columbus, Georgia. He is also the former mayor of Columbus. He was first elected mayor in 1994, after twelve years as a city councilor. In 1998, Peters became the first Columbus mayor to win re-election to a second term since consolidation.  He in a field of six candidates, including a black minister and the president of the N.A.A.C.P., he won without a runoff and won every black precinct in the city, which demonstrated his appeal to a cross section of the community. He served as mayor for eight years, until 2002, when Robert Poydasheff was elected. As mayor, Peters also served as public safety director of the city in charge of the police department, fire department, EMS, E-911, Muscogee County Prison, and all non-public safety departments. His success was hiring the best, including a three-star general who was commander of Fort Benning, Georgia. Gen. Carmen Cavezza was requested by Peters to be his city manager, and he accepted. They had one of the best relationships in the history of the city as evidenced by eight great years without a tax increase and over a billion dollars of new investment in the city.

Peters graduated from Hardaway High School in 1967, in Columbus, Georgia, and later earned an undergraduate degree in criminal justice, and a post-graduate degree in education at Columbus State University. He graduated with a J.D. from Woodrow Wilson College of Law in 1979 while the director of the police academy in Macon. He drove to Atlanta at night for three years to attend law school and passed the state bar exam prior to graduating from law school, while working full-time.

Peters was one of ten elected officials in the nation to represent the United States in a governmental exchange program with Australia. Peters was named "Ambassador of Goodwill" for the Western Hemisphere Institute for Security Cooperation (WHINSEC), formerly the School of the Americas. In 2002, Peters was presented with the "Order of Saint Maurice" by Gen. Paul Eaton, Commanding General of Fort Benning.

Bobby is a member of Calvary Baptist Church of Columbus, Georgia and has two daughters, Kelly and Jennifer, as well as three grandchildren.

References
 Historical List of Mayors, columbusga.org; retrieved May 2010

External links 
 

Mayors of Columbus, Georgia
Georgia (U.S. state) state court judges
Columbus State University alumni
1940s births
Living people
Recipients of the Order of Saint Maurice
Year of birth missing (living people)
Place of birth missing (living people)
Superior court judges in the United States